Peraza is a surname. Notable people with the surname include:

Armando Peraza (1924–2014), Latin jazz percussionist
Carlos Castillo Peraza (1947–2000), intellectual, journalist and Mexican politician, Member of the National Action Party
Cosme de la Torriente y Peraza, Cuban politician
Elluz Peraza (born 1958), pageant titleholder, was born in Caracas, Venezuela
Enrique Caballero Peraza (born 1959), Mexican politician, Medical Doctor and Psychologist
Guillén Peraza, Castilian Count
Hernan Peraza the Elder, Castilian conquistador and territorial lord
Hernan Peraza the Younger, Castilian conquistador and territorial lord
Inés Peraza, Castilian territorial Lady
José Peraza, Venezuelan baseball player
Juanita García Peraza (1897–1970), founder of the only Protestant religion of Puerto Rican origin
Kevin Peraza, Mexican - American BMX freestyle competitor
Larrea Peraza, Cuban olympic beach volleyballer at the 2008 Summer Olympics
Miguel Peraza (born 1959), Mexican self-taught sculptor, born in Mexico City
Oswald Peraza (born 2000), Venezuelan baseball player
Oswaldo Peraza (born 1962), former starting pitcher in Major League Baseball
Sergio Peraza, Mexican sculptor

Spanish-language surnames